Lophiotoma abbreviata is a species of sea snail, a marine gastropod mollusk in the family Turridae, the turrids.
Subspecies
 Lophiotoma abbreviata abbreviata (Reeve, 1843)
 Lophiotoma abbreviata lifuensis (G. B. Sowerby III, 1907)
 Lophiotoma abbreviata ustulata (Reeve, 1846)

Description
The fusiform shell reaches a length of 35 mm and a diameter of 12–15 mm. The shell is rather stout, with a prominent shoulder keel, composed of two approximate ribs, and less prominent revolving ribs and lines below it, articulated with dark chestnut spots.

Distribution
This marine species occurs along the Mascarene basin and the Philippines.

References

 Drivas, J. & M. Jay (1988). Coquillages de La Réunion et de l'île Maurice

External links
 
 Reeve, L. A. (1843-1846). Monograph of the genus Pleurotoma. In: Conchologia Iconica, or, illustrations of the shells of molluscous animals, vol. 1, pl. 1-40 and unpaginated text. L. Reeve & Co., London
 Puillandre N., Fedosov A.E., Zaharias P., Aznar-Cormano L. & Kantor Y.I. (2017). A quest for the lost types of Lophiotoma (Gastropoda: Conoidea: Turridae): integrative taxonomy in a nomenclatural mess. Zoological Journal of the Linnean Society. 181: 243-271

abbreviata
Gastropods described in 1843